Phosphide iodides or iodide phosphides are compounds containing anions composed of iodide (I−) and phosphide (P3−). They can be considered as mixed anion compounds. They are in the category of pnictidehalides. Related compounds include the phosphide chlorides, arsenide iodides antimonide iodides and phosphide bromides.

Phosphorus can form clusters or chains in these compounds, so that some are 1-dimensional or fibrous.

Phosphide iodides are often metallic, black or dark red in colour.

List

References

Phosphides
Iodides
Mixed anion compounds